Raycho Tsonev (born 24 February 1936) is a Bulgarian athlete. He competed in the men's long jump at the 1964 Summer Olympics.

References

1936 births
Living people
Athletes (track and field) at the 1964 Summer Olympics
Bulgarian male long jumpers
Olympic athletes of Bulgaria
Place of birth missing (living people)